The 1999 Tippeligaen was the 55th completed season of top division football in Norway. 

Each team played 26 games with 3 points given for wins and 1 for draws. Number thirteen and fourteen are relegated, number twelve had to play two qualification matches (home and away) against number three in the 1. divisjon (where number one and two were directly promoted) for the last spot.

Teams and locations
Note: Table lists in alphabetical order.

League table

Relegation play-offs
Start won the play-offs against Strømsgodset 3–2 on aggregate. Start won 3–2 on aggregate and was promoted to Tippeligaen. Strømsgodset was relegated to 1. divisjon.''

Results

Season statistics

Top scorers

Attendances

References 

Eliteserien seasons
Norway
Norway
1